The Batu Tiga Komuter station is a KTM Komuter train station located in Batu Tiga, Selangor, Malaysia and served by the Port Klang Line.

Batu Tiga Toll Plaza is situated just a few metres away from the station. The border between Shah Alam and Subang Jaya is also located nearby. The station is packed during rush hours and public holidays, but not as densely as other nearby KTM Komuter stations.

The Batu Tiga Komuter station was built to cater the traffic in the suburban areas of Shah Alam and Klang. The Shah Alam Komuter station, which also serves the same locality, is located 1 km away. Sometimes, the station can not be used in the event of flooding in the area.

Around the station
 Shah Alam Stadium
 Stadium Malawati

External links
Batu Tiga KTM Komuter Station

Railway stations in Selangor
Port Klang Line